Bombay Clipper is a 1942 aviation drama film directed by John Rawlins and starring William Gargan  and  Irene Hervey. The film features Maria Montez in an early role. Turhan Bey also appears.

The film was based on the exploits of oceanic flyers, flying for Pan American World Airways.

Plot
Foreign correspondent Jim Montgomery (William Gargan) agrees to quit his job when his fiancée Frankie (Irene Hervey) threatens to return home to San Francisco without him, tired of his profession always coming first. He remains in Bombay, India for one more assignment, investigating a report of missing jewels, valued at four million dollars. A mysterious man called Chundra (Turhan Bey) continues to observe him.

With the case still unsolved, Jim and Frankie board a flying boat to Manila, unaware that the gems are aboard. A passenger is mysteriously killed, but not before the jewels are hidden in Frankie's case. George Lewis (Lloyd Corrigan), another passenger, admits to being a courier for the diamonds, saying they are meant to be a gift to a foreign dignitary. Lewis, too, is then killed.

Montgomery encounters the culprit and is in danger of being thrown from the aircraft, but he is rescued by Chundra, who is actually a government agent. Frankie can not blame Jim this time for being in a hurry to get back to work and report the story.

Cast

 William Gargan as Jim Montgomery
 Irene Hervey as Frankie
 Charles Lang as Tex Harper
 Maria Montez as Sonya Dietrich Landers
 Mary Gordon as Abigail McPherson
 Lloyd Corrigan as George Lewis
 Truman Bradley as Dr. Landers
 Turhan Bey as Chundra
 Peter Lynn as Bland
 Riley Hill (credited as Roy Harris) as Steward

Production
Universal announced the film in February 1941. Stanley Rubin and Roy Chanslor started writing the script in April.

Filming on Bombay Clipper started in June 1941. Much of the movie was shot on a set made to simulate the Boeing Clipper's interior.

Reception
The Los Angeles Times called the film an "excellent melodrama."

Aviation film historian James M. Farmer in Celluloid Wings: The Impact of Movies on Aviation (1984), indicated that Bombay Clipper was "Low-minded mystery fare." In Aviation in the Cinema (1985), aviation film historian Stephen Pendo considered Bombay Clipper, a "routine" drama that pits reporter, detective and spies against each in solving a murder mystery on a flight across the Pacific Ocean.

References

Notes

Citations

Bibliography

 Farmer, James H. Celluloid Wings: The Impact of Movies on Aviation. Blue Ridge Summit, Pennsylvania: Tab Books Inc., 1984. .
 Pendo, Stephen. Aviation in the Cinema. Lanham, Maryland: Scarecrow Press, 1985. .

External links 
 
 
Review of film at Variety
Bombay Clipper at Letterbox DVD

American aviation films
1941 films
1940s adventure films
American adventure films
American black-and-white films
Films set in Mumbai
Films directed by John Rawlins
1940s American films